Nahuel Zárate (born 27 January 1993) is an Argentine footballer who plays for Estudiantes de Buenos Aires. He is left-footed, and his position was left back. He was sentenced to five years in prison for involuntary manslaughter, after crashing and killing two men.

References

External links
 

Living people
1993 births
Footballers from Buenos Aires
Argentine footballers
Association football defenders
Boca Juniors footballers
Godoy Cruz Antonio Tomba footballers
Unión de Santa Fe footballers
Atlético Tucumán footballers
Club Atlético Fénix players
Gimnasia y Esgrima de Jujuy footballers
Estudiantes de Buenos Aires footballers
Argentine Primera División players
Primera Nacional players
Primera B Metropolitana players
People convicted of manslaughter
Argentine criminals